Moments is the 17th solo studio album released by American country artist Barbara Mandrell. The album was released in August 1986 on MCA Records and was produced by Tom Collins. It would be her final studio release for the MCA label before signing with EMI America Records in 1987.

Background 
Moments was recorded in June 1986 in Nashville, Tennessee, two months before its official release. Moments contained 10 tracks of newly recorded material. Mandrell's musical style and sound changed for the album, as most of its tracks had a significant traditional country music approach, as traditional musical styles were reentering country music. This was exemplified in songs such as the sixth track, "No One Mends a Broken Heart Like You". The collection was issued as an LP album, with five songs on each side of the record. The album has not since been reissued on a compact disc.

Moments was not provided with any music reviews by critics, including Allmusic.

Release 
Moments only spawned one single, "No One Mends a Broken Heart Like You". The single was released in July 1986 and peaked at #6 on the Billboard Magazine Hot Country Singles & Tracks chart. In addition, the single also reached #5 on the Canadian RPM Country Tracks chart the same year. Moments was released in August 1986, a month after the single's release. The album peaked at #53 on the Billboard Magazine Top Country Albums chart after its release, Mandrell's lowest peak on the chart. Shortly after its release, Mandrell left MCA Records and signed with EMI America Records in 1987.

Track listing 
Side one
"Love's Gonna Get You" (Roger Murrah, Clif Magness) – 3:47
"Love Is Adventure in the Great Unknown" (John Schweers)– 3:00
"I'd Put Angels Around You" (Bobby Wood, Pat Bunch) – 3:04
"Freedom Feels Like Loneliness Today" (Charles Browder, John Wesley Ryles) – 2:32
"Come as You Were" (Paul Craft) – 2:46

Side two
"No One Mends a Broken Heart Like You" (Schweers) – 3:12
"Grand Tour of My Heart" (Carson Whitsett, Frederick Knight) – 4:00
"You Know What I'm Not Talking About" (Steve Dean, Verlon Thompson) – 3:01
"(You're Still My) Hand Holder" (Jeff Pearson) – 3:23
"Moments" (Jim Daddario, Don Pfrimmer) – 3:02

Sales chart positions 
Album

Singles

References 

1986 albums
Barbara Mandrell albums
MCA Records albums
Albums produced by Tom Collins (record producer)